The Mark Temple House is a historic house in Reading, Massachusetts.  The -story timber-frame house was built c. 1753 by Jonathan Temple, whose family lived all along Summer Street.  In the 1850s "Uncle Mark" Temple, remodeled the Georgian style house into the Greek Revival style then still popular in Reading.  Among his changes was to turn the original building 90 degrees and raise its foundation.  Oscar Foote, a locally prominent real estate developer and businessman, bought the house in 1863.

The house was listed on the National Register of Historic Places in 1984.

See also
National Register of Historic Places listings in Reading, Massachusetts
National Register of Historic Places listings in Middlesex County, Massachusetts 
Massachusetts

References

Houses on the National Register of Historic Places in Reading, Massachusetts
Houses in Reading, Massachusetts
Georgian architecture in Massachusetts
Greek Revival houses in Massachusetts